Gabor Fichtinger is an electrical engineer from Queens University in Kingston, Ontario. He was named a Fellow of the Institute of Electrical and Electronics Engineers (IEEE) in 2016 for his contributions to medical robotics and computer-assisted intervention.

References

Fellow Members of the IEEE
Living people
Year of birth missing (living people)
Place of birth missing (living people)
Academic staff of Queen's University at Kingston